Mohammad Akefian (born 31 May 1984) is an Iranian sprinter specializing in the 400 metres. He won several medals at continental level.
He was the coach of Iranian national track and field team since 2012 till present.

Competition record

References
 

1984 births
Living people
Iranian male sprinters
Competitors at the 2005 Summer Universiade
Competitors at the 2007 Summer Universiade
21st-century Iranian people